Calopterygoidea is a superfamily of damselflies in the order Odonata.

Families

 Amanipodagrionidae
 Amphipterygidae Tillyard, 1917
 Argiolestidae Fraser, 1957
 Calopterygidae Selys, 1850 (broad-winged damselflies)
 Chlorocyphidae Cowley, 1937
 Devadattidae Dijkstra, 2014
 Dicteriadidae Montgomery, 1959
 Euphaeidae Yakobson & Bianchi, 1905
 Heteragrionidae Rácenis, 1959
 Hypolestidae Fraser, 1938
 Lestoideidae Munz, 1919
 Megapodagrionidae Calvert, 1913
 Mesagrionidae
 Mesopodagrionidae
 Pentaphlebiidae Novelo-Gutiérrez, 1995
 Philogangidae Kennedy, 1920
 Philogeniidae Rácenis, 1959
 Philosinidae Kennedy, 1925
 Polythoridae Munz, 1919
 Protolestidae
 Pseudolestidae Fraser, 1957
 Rhipidolestidae
 Rimanellidae Davies & Tobin, 1984
 Tatocnemididae
 Thaumatoneuridae Fraser, 1938
 † Pseudostenolestidae Garrouste & Nel 2015

Unplaced genera
Following molecular phylogenetic studies in 2021, all of the genera under Calopterygoidea were placed into families except the genus Sciotropis Rácenis, 1959.

References

 
Damselflies
Insect superfamilies